Paenelimnoecus is an extinct genus of allosoricin shrew from the Miocene epoch. At present, its fossil range is restricted to Eurasia. It has a complicated taxonomic history and it is uncertain exactly which species belong to it. Its higher classification is also tentative.

References

Miocene mammals
Shrews
Prehistoric placental genera